Physadeia (Ancient Greek: Φυσάδεια) is a name in Greek mythology that may refer to:

Physadeia, a Libyan princess as one of the Danaids, daughters of King Danaus, who, like her sister Amymone, gave her name to a freshwater source.
Physadeia, sister of Pirithous. When the Dioscuri had taken Helen back to Sparta, they had taken captive Physadeia and Aethra, Theseus' mother. These women became handmaidens of Helen and later followed her to Troy.

Notes

References 

 Callimachus, Callimachus and Lycophron with an English translation by A. W. Mair ; Aratus, with an English translation by G. R. Mair, London: W. Heinemann, New York: G. P. Putnam 1921. Internet Archive
 Callimachus, Works. A.W. Mair. London: William Heinemann; New York: G.P. Putnam's Sons. 1921. Greek text available at the Perseus Digital Library.
 Gaius Julius Hyginus, Fabulae from The Myths of Hyginus translated and edited by Mary Grant. University of Kansas Publications in Humanistic Studies. Online version at the Topos Text Project.

Women in Greek mythology
Characters in Greek mythology